Clashes began around the village of Araouane in Mali's Tombouctou Region, after French forces launched an attack against JNIM militants in the area. The initial and subsequent engagements were part of Operation Barkhane, the goal of which is to eliminate JNIM commanders in the region.

Clashes 
French forces fired on a JNIM vehicle in the Araouane area on 29 March 2018, killing two militants and capture one. It was later confirmed that one of the dead was Moroccan Said al-Maghribi, an AQIM-JNIM commander and explosives expert close to AQIM's regional leader and a senior leader of JNIM, Djamel Okacha.

A second engagement was started by French forces on 6 April 2018, when they attacked JNIM militants in the same area, first with an airstrike and then with ground forces. The battle resulted in the death of JNIM Mauritanian commander Ayman al-Shanqiti, along with five other militants. One militant was also captured

Aftermath 
In response to the clashes, the JNIM attacked the MINUSMA base in Timbuktu Airport, known informally as the "super camp". One MINUSMA peacekeeper was killed, whilst 14 others were wounded; however, 15 militants were killed and the attempted raid was repelled.

References 

Conflicts in 2018
Battles involving France
Gao Region
Mali War